Briarcrest may refer to:

Briarcrest Christian School
Briarcrest, New Jersey